Nyren is a surname. Notable people with this surname include:

 Carl Nyrén (1917–2011), Swedish architect
 John Nyren (1764–1837), English cricket player and author
 Jonas Nyrén, Swedish metal vocalist
 Njogu Demba-Nyrén (born 1979), Gambian football player
 Pål Nyrén (born 1955), Swedish biochemist
 Richard Nyren (1734–1797), English cricket player